The Lake Margaret Power Stations comprise two hydroelectric power stations located in Western Tasmania, Australia. The power stations are part of the KingYolande Power Scheme and are owned and operated by Hydro Tasmania. Officially the Upper Lake Margaret Power Station, a conventional hydroelectric power station, and the Lower Lake Margaret Power Station, a mini-hydroelectric power station, the stations are generally collectively referred to in the singular format as the Lake Margaret Power Station.

The Upper Lake Margaret Power Station was constructed by the Mount Lyell Mining and Railway Company between 1911 and 1914. In 1984, the station was sold to the Tasmanian Hydro-Electric Commission and was officially decommissioned in 2006 and after a multimillion-dollar refit was recommissioned in 2009. The Lower Lake Margaret Power Station was built also by the Mount Lyell Mining and Railway Company in 1931 and decommissioned in 1995. After the implementation of a mini-hydro project in 2009, the project was recommissioned in 2010.

Technical details
Part of the KingYolande scheme that comprises three hydroelectric power stations, the Lake Margaret Power Stations utilise water from the naturally-forming Lake Margaret which was dammed in 1914 to increase the storage volume and head. A key feature of the development is a -long woodstave pipeline which connects the dam to a steel penstock which feeds the power station. In 2009 a new pipeline of Alaskan Yellow Cedar replaced the native King Billy Pine pipeline constructed in 1937.

Within the station building, each of the seven horizontal axis turbines are connected to open wheel generators. The first four machines were installed in 1914. Two more were added in 1918 and a seventh machine was added in 1930. Each turbine is fitted with a motorised inlet valve. The generators are connected to individual machine circuit breakers which are connected to circuit breakers for each of the four transmission circuits contained in a split bus. The station output is estimated to be  annually.

Water is delivered to the station via a  wood stave pipeline and  Fibre Reinforced Plastic penstock. The station output is estimated to be  annually.

History

In 1911 the Mount Lyell Mining and Railway Company decided to make more extensive use of electricity in its smelting operations in the mining town of Queenstown, on Tasmania's west coast. It selected Lake Margaret, a small lake high up on Mount Sedgwick, to the north-west of the town, as its catchment area.

The water was originally conveyed from the dam via a  wood stave pipeline. The Australian Woodpipe Company was consulted and employed to construct the wooden pipeline. The Mount Lyell Mining & Railway Company determined that not only was a wooden pipeline cheaper to construct, but it was also more efficient and durable than iron or steel. The local native Tasmanian timber King Billy Pine was studied but it was decided not to be suitable.

The wood stave pipeline was subsequently constructed from Oregon Pine (Douglas Fir), which was imported from Canada. The timber was shipped to the west coast town of Strahan and was transported to the Lake Margaret precinct via the Abt Railway. This pipeline rapidly deteriorated and in 1938 was replaced by a King Billy Pine wood stave pipeline, with the timber sourced locally. This pipeline was still in service until the 30 June 2006 closure of the Lake Margaret Power Scheme.

The wood stave pipeline originally joined two  steel penstock pipes which dropped  to the power station building in the Yolande Valley below. Due to the efficiency of the scheme another penstock pipe was added in 1919. Due to internal deterioration these pipes were replaced in 1969 with a single  steel pipe, by contractor John Holland. This replacement coincided with major refurbishment of the power station building, renewal of sections of the Lower Power Scheme wood stave pipeline, replacement of the transmission lines between the power station and the Queenstown substation, and post-stressing of the Lake Margaret dam wall.

The Lake Margaret Lower Power Scheme was opened in 1931. Showcasing the ingenuity and resourcefulness of the men in charge at the time, it was located downstream from the main power station and utilised water that had already powered the turbines in the main station. It housed a single Boving-Francis type turbine which, whilst having to be manually started, could be remotely controlled from the main power station, demonstrating a unique system that is considered significant in the history of power generation in Tasmania and Australia. The Lower Power Scheme was mothballed in the early 1990s.

Closure

Throughout 2005 the old plant was still in full-time use, but became the subject of debate. The Lake Margaret Precinct and Power Station were nominated for inclusion in the state heritage register due to the unique nature of the station's role as an integral part of West Coast history that has not been closed down or destroyedthe fate of many of the man made structures on the west coast that no longer serve purposes for the mining or other industries.

On 30 June 2006 the Lake Margaret Power Station closed, due to the cost and increasing difficulty of maintaining the decrepit King Billy Pine pipeline. In the days immediately before closure, five machines were operating at full output, one was idle due to insufficient water pressure and another out of service due to requiring replacement turbine buckets.

At the time of closure the pipeline was estimated to be losing 10% of the water it carried due to leakage. During early 2007 the extent of leakage was sufficient of itself to draw down the level in Lake Margaret by around 10% during a period of very low rainfall. At this time the pipeline was still under pressure although the power station remained closed.

Hydro Tasmania proposed refurbishment of the scheme with a return to operation around 2009–10. Community consultation found a strong preference for refurbishment using the existing machines plus a new wood stave pipeline rather than the use of new machines or a steel pipe.

Any reuse of the existing machinery would likely involve the installation of automatic shutdown capability to avoid the need for 24-hour manning of the power station in order to improve the economics of refurbishment. All of Tasmania's other major hydro-electric power stations were either originally built to operate unmanned (standard procedure for new power stations in Tasmania since the 1950s) or have been refurbished in recent years to enable unmanned operation.

Back to Lake Margaret Day

On 18 March 2007 Hydro Tasmania hosted the 'Back to Lake Margaret Day' at the Lake Margaret Hydro-Electric Scheme. The event was an open invitation to all people interested in the past and future of the Lake Margaret scheme. Previous residents and employees were invited to attend, and the day was officially opened by Alex Wilkinson, the oldest known person who has an association with the scheme.

During the day the mothballed power station was open for inspection, as were two of the empty  cottages which had formerly housed many of the attendees at the event. The village hall was a hive of activity during the day, with aged photographs being pinned the walls and people reminiscing about their time at Lake Margaret. The date was chosen to coincide with the Mount Lyell Twenty-Five Year Reunion Dinner, which was held in Queenstown on the same weekend and included many past employees who also have an association with Lake Margaret. About 200 people attended the Back To Lake Margaret Day.

Reopening 
In June 2008 a decision was made to return the Lake Margaret Power Station back to operational capacity. Following the various public and other efforts - the Lake Margaret system was reopened in 2009. The refurbishment included rebuilding the  wood stave penstock for the Upper Power Station. The upper power station was reopened on 12 November 2009, and the lower power station on 23 July 2010.

2014 Queenstown Heritage and Arts Festival
In October 2014, the Queenstown Heritage and Arts Festival (now known as The Unconformity) programme included events and arts works at the Lake Margaret precinct.

Engineering heritage award 
The power scheme received a Historic Engineering Marker from Engineers Australia as part of its Engineering Heritage Recognition Program.

See also

 List of power stations in Tasmania

References

Further reading

External links 
 https://web.archive.org/web/20060819111901/http://www.hydro.com.au/home/Energy/Cultural%2BHeritage/Conservation%2BManagement%2BPlans.htm

Energy infrastructure completed in 1914
Energy infrastructure completed in 1919
Energy infrastructure completed in 1930
Hydroelectric power stations in Tasmania
Western Tasmania
Mount Lyell Mining and Railway Company
Energy infrastructure completed in 2009
Energy infrastructure completed in 2010
Hydro-Tasmania
Recipients of Engineers Australia engineering heritage markers